Hopson House is located in Alexandria, Louisiana.  It was added to the National Register of Historic Places on December 5, 1984, and removed in 2016.

References

Houses on the National Register of Historic Places in Louisiana
Houses completed in 1885
Houses in Alexandria, Louisiana
National Register of Historic Places in Rapides Parish, Louisiana
Former National Register of Historic Places in Louisiana